P53 regulation associated lncRNA is a protein that in humans is encoded by the PRAL gene.

References